The Anna Crusis Women's Choir is the oldest existing feminist choir in the United States, and is considered to be a founder of the North American LGBT choral movement. It was established by Catherine Roma in 1975 in Philadelphia, in the U.S. state of Pennsylvania. Including both lesbian and straight women, Anna Crusis is the earliest formed of the Gay and Lesbian Association of Choruses (GALA) and the first women's chorus to become a member of GALA.

The choir is named, not for a person, but for anacrusis, a musical term for "the unaccented – or 'feminine' – upbeat that sets the stage for a downbeat." The choir focuses on music by, for and about women, and has commissioned pieces from a variety of composers. It also recovers and performs historical pieces by women composers.

Anna Crusis Women's Choir members voted to change the name of the choir to Anna Crusis Feminist Choir. This name change reflects a commitment to gender-expansive membership while also honoring our history and core values.

Politics and Process 

Anna Crusis has a strong educational and social mission, performing music from all over the world and addressing issues of peace, justice and equality both on stage and off. They have a long history of supporting LGBT issues, frequently performing with other groups at events such as International Women's Day and Philly Pride.

An amateur community choir, performing a cappella, Anna Crusis places a strong emphasis on inclusiveness, welcoming female singers of all ages and sexual orientations. The choir has included both physically impaired and hearing impaired singers, and traditionally includes a sign language interpreter at its concerts.  Although singers must audition, the choir includes  singers of all levels of musical training ranging from those who do not read music, to those with professional training.

Artistic Directors

Catherine Roma, 1975-1983 

Catherine Roma was born in Philadelphia and attended Germantown Friends School, a Quaker School. Roma earned degrees in music (BA) and choral conducting (MM) at the University of Wisconsin–Madison and became involved in lesbian and feminist politics while studying there.  While in Wisconsin she worked with historian Ann D. Gordon to identify music by and about women throughout history, creating the folk opera American Women: A Choral History for the United States Bicentennial. After returning to Philadelphia in 1975 to teach music at Abington Friends School, she formed the Anna Crusis Women's Choir, which performed American Women: A Choral History at a number of colleges throughout the northeast.

By starting Anna Crusis, the first feminist women’s choir in the United States, Cathy Roma became one of the founding mothers of the women's choral movement. Her beliefs in feminism, social justice, and Quaker models of leadership fundamentally shaped the mission and direction of Anna Crusis. Decisions were often made through a process similar to Quaker consensus, in which all members had a voice.

Cathy Roma left Anna in 1983 to pursue a graduate degree in music at the University of Cincinnati's College-Conservatory of Music, receiving her Doctor of Musical Arts Degree in 1989.  In Cincinnati Roma founded MUSE (Cincinnati's Women's Choir).

Jane Hulting, 1983–2005, sabbatical 2003 

With the departure of Cathy Roma, the future of Anna Crusis became uncertain.  However, the choir was able to connect with Jane Hulting, originally from Minnesota.  A graduate of the Conservatory of Music in Kansas City, Hulting  moved to Philadelphia in 1983 to attend the Annenberg School for Communication at the University of Pennsylvania. She became musical director of Anna Crusis in 1984. Under Hulting's direction, the choir's repertoire continued to be innovative, including a wide variety of languages and musical styles.

Jacqueline Coren, interim 2003, 2005-2011 

Jacqueline Coren's first involvement with the Anna Crusis Women's Choir was as a singer. When Jane Hulting went on sabbatical, Jackie stepped in as interim director.  When Jane left, Coren auditioned for the choir's board of directors and was eventually selected as the new musical director of the choir. Jacqueline Coren holds both a master's degree in choral conducting from Westminster Choir College in Princeton, New Jersey and a master's degree in divinity from Quaker Earlham School of Religion. In addition to her work with Anna Crusis, she worked as choral director at the George School, a Quaker school in Bucks County, Pennsylvania, and formed the Pendle Hill Chorus. Anna Crusis  continued to perform a broad range of music, often reflecting political and social concerns of choir members of the choir who supported Anna Crusis' mission of social change through music.  The choir continued to collaborate with other groups, including performing with Holly Near in a People's Music Network concert, participating in GALA's Equality Forum, and singing in a merged chorus with the Philadelphia Gay Men's Chorus and the Mendelssohn Club of Philadelphia.

Miriam Davidson, interim 2011, 2012– 

Like Jackie Coren, Miriam Davidson's first connection to Anna Crusis was as a singer, in the 1980s. Beginning in 1995, she performed as part of the duo Wishing Chair. When Jackie Coren went on sabbatical, Miriam temporarily replaced her as interim director.  When Jackie Coren retired as musical director, Miriam replaced her as the new musical director of the choir.

Discography 
 But We Fight For Roses Too, 1989, remastered in 2010
 Fresh Cut, 1993
 Spaces Between the Stars, 2000
 The song Visions of Children, on Seeds: The Songs of Pete Seeger, Vol. 3, 2003
 Anna Live: Raising Our Voices, 2007
 Sing Truth to Power, 2018

Works commissioned
 Sappho, composer Anna Rubin, 20 minute piece for women's choir, 7 instrumentalists and narrator, first performed June 1978.
 Eurydice (1978), composer Chester Biscardi, text by H.D., for women's chorus and seventeen instruments, first performed 1 December 1979.
 Oda a las Ranas (Ode to Frogs), composer Vivian Fine, text by Pablo Neruda, first performed 13 June 1980.
 Betty Crocker, composer Patsy Rogers, text by Ellen Mason, first performed 5 June 1982.
 Wind Horse (A Sound Mandala), composer Pauline Oliveros, first performed 1992.
 Daughter, Awake With the Moon, composer Janice Hamer, text by Julia Budenz, first performed, 1992.
 Word of Mouth (Ode to Yemaya), by Nehassaiu deGannes, first performed June 1994.
 Sophia (In memory of Ray Henry), composer Julia Haines, text by Janet Mason, first performed 19 November 1994
My Voice: a work in 3 movements for women's choir and percussion (My Voice, Vines Entwined, Don't Mess with Me), composer Jennifer Higdon, first performed 1995. (3d mvt, "Don't Mess With Me" premiered, whole piece the next June.)

 No One Has Imagined Us, composer Sharon Hershey, text by Adrienne Rich, first performed 1997
 New Face, composer Janika Vandervelde, text by Alice Walker, first performed July 2000, GALA Festival with Vox Femina, Sound Circle and Anna Crusis Women's Choir
 Finding Her Here,  composer Joan Szymko, text by Jayne Relaford Brown, first performed 14 May 2005
 She Sweeps With Many Brooms, composer Lisa Westerterp, text by Emily Dickinson, for women's voices and saxophone quartet, first performed 14 May 2005
 The Oldest Feminist Choir (A Quilobet), composer Judith Palmer, text by Jennifer Raison, first performed 14 May 2005.  (Many other works by choir member Judith Palmer have been performed by the choir over the years.)
 The Shape of My Soul, composer Andrea Clearfield, text by Susan Windle, for women's voices and string quartet, first performed 14 May 2005
 Madrigals for the Information Age, vt. The Cell Phone Madrigals, composer Peter Hilliard, text by Matt Boresi, first performed 2006
 Consider Krakatau, composer Peter Hilliard, text by Matt Boresi, co-commissioned and first performed by the Mendelssohn Club of Philadelphia, Philadelphia Gay Men's Chorus, and the Anna Crusis Women’s Choir, May 1, 2009.
 Into the Light, composer Robert Maggio, text by Mary Liz McNamara, co-commissioned and first performed by the Mendelssohn Club of Philadelphia, Philadelphia Gay Men's Chorus, and the Anna Crusis Women’s Choir, May 1, 2009.
 Voyage: I, Too, Can Sing a Dream, composer Cynthia Folio, co-commissioned and first performed by the Mendelssohn Club of Philadelphia, Philadelphia Gay Men's Chorus, and the Anna Crusis Women’s Choir, May 1, 2009.
 Blessed be, composer Joan Szymko, text by Robin Morgan, first performed June 2015 (40th Anniversary)
 Her Name Was, written by SistaStrings, Minneapolis, MN.  Adaptation for full choir first performed on December 14, 2019.

Main Concerts / themes / guest artists

Anna Crusis sings a variety of concerts throughout the year, often with other organizations. Its main performances are its winter concert, usually held in November or December, and its spring concert, usually held in May or June. Concerts have included:

Miriam Davidson 
 December 14 & 15, 2019, "Keep Hope Alive" with Sister Cities Girlchoir.
 June 1 & 2, 2019, "Beyond Boundaries" (Also a joint performance with Philadelphia Gay Men's Chorus June 22, 2019 to commemorate 50th Anniversary of Stonewall) 
 December 8 & 9, 2018, "Declaration of Inter Dependence"
 June 2 & 3, 2018, "Sing Truth to Power"
 December 2 & 3, 2017, "Song is a Traveler", with Moira Smiley
 April 21, 2017, "Now More Than Ever", with Holly Near
 December 10 & 11, 2016, “This Land is Our Land”
 June 3 & 4, 2016, "Stronger for the Struggle"
 December 5 & 6, 2015, "Sound Mind: Your brain on music"
 June 6 & 7, 2015, 'Reclaiming the “F” Word', 40th anniversary concert, with all four conductors
 December 6 & 7, 2014, "Stand UP! Sing OUT!" with special guest Melanie DeMore
 June 7, 2014, "Beauty Unmasked: Songs of Strength, Wisdom and the Beauty Inside"
 December 7 & 8th, 2013, "Hungry for Justice" in partnership with Philabundance and MANNA.
 December 1 & 2, 2012, "Simply Love: A Marriage Equality Event" with members of Philadelphia Gay Men's Chorus and Philadelphia Voices of Pride

Jacqueline Coren 
 December 10 & 11th, 2011, "Breaking News: 'Anna'dotes to the Headlines," with guest Sharon Katz.
 June 12, 2010, "35 years of singing for social justice," artistic director Jacqueline Coren, with guest conductors Catherine Roma and Jane Hulting.
 November 14 & 15, 2009, with guests Svitanya and Voices of a Different Dream.
 May 30, 2009, "All Our Children Can Fly," with guest Amy Dixon-Kolar.
 June 2007, "In the Cradle of Our Land"
 December 2, 3, 4, 2005, "And All the Earth Shall Sing"

Jane Hulting 
 May 14, 2005, "Finding Her Here", last concert with Jane Hulting
 Dec. 4,5, 2004, "Seasons of Love" 
 Dec. 6, 7, 2003, "All the Wild Wonders"
 Dec. 7, 8, 2002, "Workin’ for the Dawn of Peace"
 Dec. 1, 2, 2001, "Something Inside So Strong"
 Nov. 11, 12, 2000, "Sounds of the Spirit Where Angels Live", with guest Harold Smith on didgeridoo
 Nov. 13,14, 1999, "Higher Ground"
 Nov. 14 15, 1998, "Coming into our years – 150 yrs. of feminism in Action", a Musical Celebration of the 1848 Women’s Rights Convention in Seneca Falls, NY
 June 6, 1998, "No one has imagined us", Anna Crusis Women's Choir with Renaissance City Women's Choir (Pittsburgh), ACCO, A Chorus Celebrating Women (Allentown), and Central Pennsylvania Womyn's Chorus (Harrisburg)
 Nov. 15, 16, 1997, "When Choirs Sway"
 June 7, 1997, "Anna Gumbo"
 Nov. 8, 9, 1996, "Mama, I Want to Make Rhythm"
 June 8, 1996, "Reach Across the Lines"
 Feb. 26, 1996, reception for The Women's Leadership Forum of the Democratic National Committee and the Five County Democratic Women's Coalition, honoring First Lady Hillary Clinton and Tipper Gore
 Jan. 27, 1995, "Common Threads" – The Concert! with guests Pete Seeger and Reggie Harris
 Nov. 10, 11, 1995, "Celebrating 75 yrs of Women’s Suffrage", with Sacred Ways Dance Company
 Nov. 9, 1994, "Joyful Recognition of the Feminine in all our lives", performed Sophia by Julia Haine
 June 11, 1995, "Women's Voices: Women's Strengths", performed Word of Mouth by Nehassaiu deGannes.
 April 1992, "A Harmony of Voices," with guests Karen Saillant and Don Kawash, in partnership with the Bucks County commissioners' Advisory Committee on Women
 June 8, 1991, "PeaceWorks", protesting Operation Desert Storm.
 April 26, 1985, 10th anniversary concert
 June 8, 1984, first spring concert with Jane Hulting

Catherine Roma 
 June 11, 1982, final concert with Cathy Roma as director
 June 1978, with first commissioned piece, Sappho by Anna Rubin
 June 1977, with guest conductor Kay Gardner
 1975 American Women: A Choral History, a Bicentennial folk opera

The Themis Award
As of 2009, the Anna Crusis Women's Choir created the Themis Award, named for the Greek goddess of visionary justice, to honor women dedicated to social justice, equality and peace, from the greater Philadelphia area.  The following women have been honored:

 Jane Golden, 2009, Executive Director of the Philadelphia Mural Arts Program
 Doris Polsky and Shirley Melvin (posthumously), 2010, Jewish real estate brokers who worked to ensure that the Mount Airy neighborhood of Philadelphia was diverse and racially integrated.
 First United Methodist Church of Germantown (FUMCOG), 2011, a reconciling church, for its commitment to being inclusive, diverse, and activist.

Awards Received 
 1988, Women's International League for Peace and Freedom local awards; main awards to poet Sonia Sanchez and singer-songwriter Holly Near.
 1990, Best of Philly Awards, Best Women's Choir.
 2014, National Endowment for the Arts Award, jointly to The Philadelphia Singers, Sister Singers GirlChoir, and Anna Crusis Women's Choir, to fund "Women Aloud: Celebrating Women in Music" concert, March 2016.
 2017, Brigit Award for Excellence in the Arts, Association for the Study of Women and Mythology

References

External links
 Anna Crusis Women's Choir, official website
 Anna Crusis Women's Choir Website including a Discography with set lists and playable selections
 Anna Crusis Women's Choir on YouTube  
 Anna Crusis Women's Choir from MiND TV

1975 establishments in Pennsylvania
American choirs
LGBT choruses
Feminism in the United States
Musical groups established in 1975
Women's choirs
History of women in Pennsylvania